The 2010 Internazionali Tennis Val Gardena Südtirol was a professional tennis tournament played on carpet in Ortisei, Italy between 8 and 14 November 2010. It was the first edition of the tournament which is part of the 2010 ATP Challenger Tour.

ATP entrants

Seeds

 Rankings are as of November 1, 2010.

Other entrants
The following players received wildcards into the singles main draw:
  Daniele Bracciali
  Farrukh Dustov
  Claudio Grassi
  Michał Przysiężny

The following players received entry from the qualifying draw:
  Marius Copil
  Lukáš Lacko
  Jan Mertl
  Michal Schmid

Champions

Singles

 Michał Przysiężny def.  Lukáš Lacko, 6–3, 7–5

Doubles

 Mikhail Elgin /  Alexander Kudryavtsev def.  Tomasz Bednarek /  Michał Przysiężny, 3–6, 6–3, [10–3]

External links
Official Website
ITF Search 
ATP official site

Internazionali Tennis Val Gardena Sudtirol
Carpet court tennis tournaments
Internazionali Tennis Val Gardena Südtirol
2010 in Italian tennis